The 1948 Utah Redskins football team was an American football team that represented the University of Utah as a member of the Skyline Six Conference during the 1948 college football season. In their 24th season under head coach Ike Armstrong, the Redskins compiled an overall record of 8–1–1 with a mark of 5–0 against conference opponents, winning the Skyline Six title.

Schedule

After the season

NFL Draft
Utah had two players selected in the 1949 NFL Draft.

References

Utah
Utah Utes football seasons
Mountain States Conference football champion seasons
Utah Redskins football